Local elections were held in the province of Isabela on May 9, 2022, as part of the 2022 Philippine general election. Voters selected candidates for all local positions: a mayor, vice-mayor and councilors, as well as members of the Sangguniang Panlalawigan, the governor, vice-governor and for the six districts of Isabela for board members and congress.

The province of Isabela is considered by Comelec as one of the vote-rich provinces in the Philippines for having 1,112,858 voters in the 2022 national and local elections.

Gubernatorial elections

Governor
Incumbent Governor Rodolfo Albano III is running for his second consecutive term. His opponents are Glorieta Almazan and Romeo Carlos. Albano remains as governor of Isabela.

|-bgcolor=black
|colspan=5|

Vice governor
Incumbent Faustino Dy III is running for reelection.

Board members elections

1st District
City: Ilagan
Municipalities: Cabagan, Delfin Albano, Divilacan, Maconacon, San Pablo, Santa Maria, Santo Tomas, Tumauini
Population (2020): 399,196
Electorate (2022):
Voters of the district will elect two board members at-large.

|-

|-bgcolor=black
|colspan=5|
|-

|-

|-

2nd District
Municipalities: Benito Soliven, Gamu, Naguilian, Palanan,  Reina Mercedes, San Mariano
Population (2020): 199,903
Electorate (2022):
Voters of the district will elect two board members at-large.

|-bgcolor=black
|colspan=5|

3rd District
Municipalities: Alicia, Angadanan, Cabatuan, Ramon, San Mateo
Population (2020): 282,027
Electorate (2022):
Voters of the district will elect two board members at-large.

|-

|-bgcolor=black
|colspan=5|
|-

|-

|-

4th District
City: Santiago
Municipalities: Cordon, Dinapigue, Jones, San Agustin
Population (2020): 268,602
Electorate (2022):
Voters of the district will elect two board members at-large.

|-bgcolor=black
|colspan=5|

5th District
Municipalities: Aurora, Burgos, Luna, Mallig, Quezon, Quirino, Roxas, San Manuel
Population (2020): 267,550
Electorate (2022):
Voters of the district will elect two board members at-large.

|-bgcolor=black
|colspan=5|

6th District
City: Cauayan
Municipalities: Echague, San Guillermo, San Isidro
Population (2020): 279,772
Electorate (2022):
Voters of the district will elect two board members at-large.

|-bgcolor=black
|colspan=5|

Congressional elections

1st District

|-bgcolor=black
|colspan=5|

2nd District

|-bgcolor=black
|colspan=5|

3rd District

4th District

|-bgcolor=black
|colspan=5|

5th District

|-bgcolor=black
|colspan=5|

6th District
Armando Velasco was a former election commissioner and he is running for congressional seat for this election.

|-bgcolor=black
|colspan=5|

City elections

Cauayan
As of May 13, 2022, 100.00% precincts have reported.

|-bgcolor=black
|colspan=5|

|-bgcolor=black
|colspan=5|

Ilagan
As of May 13, 2022, 100.00% precincts have reported. Both Diaz and Bello are unopposed in the local elections for mayoralty and vice mayoralty positions respectively.

|-bgcolor=black
|colspan=5|

Santiago
As of May 13, 2022, 100.00% precincts have reported. Supporters of Miranda protest the election results claiming that 4,255 ballots were not included, vote-buying and other offenses.

|-bgcolor=black
|colspan=5|

|-bgcolor=black
|colspan=5|

|-bgcolor=black
|colspan=5|

Municipal elections

Alicia
As of May 13, 2022, 100.00% precincts have reported.

|-bgcolor=black
|colspan=5|

|-bgcolor=black
|colspan=5|

|-bgcolor=black
|colspan=5|

Angadanan
As of May 13, 2022, 100.00% precincts have reported.

|-bgcolor=black
|colspan=5|

|-bgcolor=black
|colspan=5|

|-bgcolor=black
|colspan=5|

Aurora
As of May 13, 2022, 77.27% precincts have reported.

|-bgcolor=black
|colspan=5|

|-bgcolor=black
|colspan=5|

|-bgcolor=black
|colspan=5|

Benito Soliven
As of May 13, 2022, 100.00% precincts have reported.

|-bgcolor=black
|colspan=5|

|-bgcolor=black
|colspan=5|

Burgos
As of May 13, 2022, 100.00% precincts have reported.

|-bgcolor=black
|colspan=5|

|-bgcolor=black
|colspan=5|

Cabagan
As of May 13, 2022, 100.00% precincts have reported.

|-bgcolor=black
|colspan=5|

|-bgcolor=black
|colspan=5|

Cabatuan
As of May 13, 2022, 100.00% precincts have reported.

|-bgcolor=black
|colspan=5|

|-bgcolor=black
|colspan=5|

Cordon
As of May 13, 2022, 100.00% precincts have reported.

|-bgcolor=black
|colspan=5|

|-bgcolor=black
|colspan=5|

|-bgcolor=black
|colspan=5|

Delfin Albano
As of May 13, 2022, 100.00% precincts have reported.

|-bgcolor=black
|colspan=5|

|-bgcolor=black
|colspan=5|

|-bgcolor=black
|colspan=5|

Dinapigue
As of May 13, 2022, 100.00% precincts have reported.

|-bgcolor=black
|colspan=5|

|-bgcolor=black
|colspan=5|

|-bgcolor=black
|colspan=5|

Divilacan
As of May 13, 2022, 100.00% precincts have reported.

|-bgcolor=black
|colspan=5|

|-bgcolor=black
|colspan=5|

Echague
As of May 13, 2022, 100.00% precincts have reported.

|-bgcolor=black
|colspan=5|

|-bgcolor=black
|colspan=5|

|-bgcolor=black
|colspan=5|

Gamu
As of May 13, 2022, 100.00% precincts have reported.

|-bgcolor=black
|colspan=5|

|-bgcolor=black
|colspan=5|

|-bgcolor=black
|colspan=5|

Jones
As of May 13, 2022, 100.00% precincts have reported.

|-bgcolor=black
|colspan=5|

|-bgcolor=black
|colspan=5|

|-bgcolor=black
|colspan=5|

Luna
As of May 13, 2022, 100.00% precincts have reported.

|-bgcolor=black
|colspan=5|

|-bgcolor=black
|colspan=5|

|-bgcolor=black
|colspan=5|

Maconacon
As of May 13, 2022, 100.00% precincts have reported.

|-bgcolor=black
|colspan=5|

|-bgcolor=black
|colspan=5|

|-bgcolor=black
|colspan=5|

Mallig
As of May 13, 2022, 100.00% precincts have reported.

|-bgcolor=black
|colspan=5|

|-bgcolor=black
|colspan=5|

|-bgcolor=black
|colspan=5|

Naguilian
As of May 13, 2022, 100.00% precincts have reported.

|-bgcolor=black
|colspan=5|

|-bgcolor=black
|colspan=5|

Palanan
As of May 13, 2022, 100.00% precincts have reported.

|-bgcolor=black
|colspan=5|

|-bgcolor=black
|colspan=5|

|-bgcolor=black
|colspan=5|

Quezon
As of May 13, 2022, 100.00% precincts have reported.

|-bgcolor=black
|colspan=5|

Quirino
As of May 13, 2022, 100.00% precincts have reported.

|-bgcolor=black
|colspan=5|

|-bgcolor=black
|colspan=5|

|-bgcolor=black
|colspan=5|

Ramon
As of May 13, 2022, 100.00% precincts have reported.

|-bgcolor=black
|colspan=5|

|-bgcolor=black
|colspan=5|

|-bgcolor=black
|colspan=5|

Reina Mercedes
As of May 13, 2022, 100.00% precincts have reported.

|-bgcolor=black
|colspan=5|

|-bgcolor=black
|colspan=5|

|-bgcolor=black
|colspan=5|

Roxas
As of May 13, 2022, 100.00% precincts have reported.

|-bgcolor=black
|colspan=5|

San Agustin
As of May 13, 2022, 100.00% precincts have reported.

|-bgcolor=black
|colspan=5|

|-bgcolor=black
|colspan=5|

|-bgcolor=black
|colspan=5|

San Guillermo
As of May 13, 2022, 100.00% precincts have reported.

|-bgcolor=black
|colspan=5|

San Isidro
As of May 13, 2022, 100.00% precincts have reported.

|-bgcolor=black
|colspan=5|

|-bgcolor=black
|colspan=5|

|-bgcolor=black
|colspan=5|

San Manuel
As of May 13, 2022, 100.00% precincts have reported.

|-bgcolor=black
|colspan=5|

|-bgcolor=black
|colspan=5|

San Mariano
As of May 13, 2022, 100.00% precincts have reported.

|-bgcolor=black
|colspan=5|

San Mateo
As of May 13, 2022, 100.00% precincts have reported.

|-bgcolor=black
|colspan=5|

|-bgcolor=black
|colspan=5|

|-bgcolor=black
|colspan=5|

San Pablo
As of May 13, 2022, 100.00% precincts have reported.

|-bgcolor=black
|colspan=5|

|-bgcolor=black
|colspan=5|

|-bgcolor=black
|colspan=5|

Santa Maria
As of May 13, 2022, 100.00% precincts have reported.

|-bgcolor=black
|colspan=5|

|-bgcolor=black
|colspan=5|

|-bgcolor=black
|colspan=5|

Santo Tomas
As of May 13, 2022, 100.00% precincts have reported.

|-bgcolor=black
|colspan=5|

|-bgcolor=black
|colspan=5|

|-bgcolor=black
|colspan=5|

Tumauini
As of May 13, 2022, 100.00% precincts have reported.

|-bgcolor=black
|colspan=5|

|-bgcolor=black
|colspan=5|

Barangay elections

References

Notes

Citations

2022 Philippine local elections
May 2022 events in the Philippines